Emoia kitcheneri is a species of lizard in the family Scincidae. It is found on Sumba in Indonesia.

References

Emoia
Reptiles described in 1998
Reptiles of Indonesia
Endemic fauna of Indonesia
Taxa named by Richard Alfred How
Taxa named by Lawrence Alec Smith
Taxa named by Najamuddin Saleh